The 1911 The Citadel Bulldogs football team represented The Citadel as a member of the Southern Intercollegiate Athletic Association during the 1911 college football season. This was the seventh year of intercollegiate football at The Citadel, with Louis LeTellier serving as coach for the first season. All home games are believed to have been played at College Park Stadium in Hampton Park.

Schedule

References

Citadel
The Citadel Bulldogs football seasons
Citadel Bulldogs football